This is a list of Portuguese television related events from 1996.

Events
29 April - Canal 1 and TV2 revert to their original titles of RTP1 and RTP2, with new logos.
Unknown - José Nuno Martins takes over from Catarina Furtado as host of Chuva de Estrelas.
Unknown - Rui Faria Santos wins the third series of Chuva de Estrelas, performing as Elton John. He becomes the first male finalist to have won on this show.

Debuts

International
 Caroline in the City (Unknown)

Television shows

1990s
Chuva de Estrelas (1993-2000)

Ending this year

Births

Deaths